Kong Krailat is a district (amphoe) in the southeastern part of Sukhothai province, in the lower northern region of Thailand.

Geography
Neighboring districts are (from the southwest clockwise): Khiri Mat and Mueang Sukhothai of Sukhothai Province, Phrom Phiram and Bang Rakam of Phitsanulok province.

History
The district was renamed from Ban Krai to Kong Krailat in 1939.

Administration
The district is divided into 11 sub-districts (tambons), which are further subdivided into 126 villages (mubans). The township (thesaban tambon) Kong Krailat covers parts of tambons Kong, Ban Krang and Pa Faek. There are a further 10 tambon administrative organizations (TAO).

References

External links
amphoe.com

Kong Krailat